KF Kukësi B is an Albanian football club based in the small town of Kukës. It's the B team of FK Kukësi. They are currently competing in the Albanian Second Division.

References

Kukësi B
B Team
Reserve team football in Albania
Albanian Third Division clubs